Made for Each Other is a 1939 American romantic comedy film directed by John Cromwell, produced by David O. Selznick, and starring Carole Lombard, James Stewart, and Charles Coburn.  Lombard and Stewart portray a couple who get married after only knowing each other for one day.

The film is now in the public domain in the United States, with the original film negative owned by Disney.

Plot
John Mason (James Stewart) is a young attorney in New York City and a milquetoast. He has been doing his job well, and he has a chance of being made a partner in his law firm, especially if he marries Eunice (Ruth Weston), the daughter of his employer, Judge Doolittle. However, John meets Jane (Carole Lombard) during a business trip, and they fall in love and marry immediately. Eunice eventually marries another lawyer in the firm, Carter (Donald Briggs). John's impertinent mother (Lucile Watson) is disappointed with his choice, and an important trial forces him to cancel the honeymoon. He wins the case, but by that time Judge Doolittle has chosen John's kowtowing yes-man coworker Carter as the new partner.

Jane encourages John to demand a raise and a promotion, but with finances tightened by the Depression, Doolittle requires that all employees accept pay cuts. After Jane has a baby, John becomes discouraged by his unpaid bills, and his mother, who lives with them in their small apartment, is destroying their marriage.

On New Year's Eve, 1938–39, the baby is rushed to the hospital with pneumonia. The baby will die within hours unless a serum is delivered by plane from Salt Lake City. Doolittle agrees to provide funding to deliver the serum, but with a storm raging, and with a wife and children to consider, the pilot refuses to fly. John pleads over the telephone, and the pilot's unmarried friend takes the job. The new pilot almost crashes in the mountains, and the plane's engine catches fire a short distance from New York. The pilot is also injured and knocked unconscious after jumping from the plane and parachuting to safety, but he crawls to a nearby farm house after he comes to. The farmer sees the box containing the serum and telephones the hospital, and the baby is saved. A few months later, John is made partner at the law firm and his son speaks his first words.

Cast

 Carole Lombard as Jane Mason
 James Stewart as John Horace Mason
 Charles Coburn as Judge Joseph M. Doolittle
 Lucile Watson as Mrs. Harriet Mason
 Eddie Quillan as Conway
 Alma Kruger as Sister Madeline
 Louise Beavers as Lily, Cook #3 (uncredited)
 Ward Bond as Jim Hatton (uncredited)
 Donald Briggs as Mr. Carter (uncredited)
 Esther Dale as Annie, Cook #1 (uncredited)
 Harry Davenport as Dr. Healy (uncredited)
 Fern Emmett as Famer's Wife (uncredited)
 Ruth Gillette as Tipsy Blonde at New Year's Eve Party (uncredited)
 Olin Howland as Farmer (uncredited)
 Nella Walker as Dr. Langham's Nurse-Receptionist (uncredited)
 Milburn Stone as Newark official (uncredited)

Reception and legacy
Frank S. Nugent of The New York Times called the film "thoroughly delightful", but it lost $292,000 at the box office.

The film was re-edited into a comedy short by Jeff Baena for an episode of the Showtime anthology series Cinema Toast. Lombard, Stewart, Charles Coburn, and Lucile Watson were dubbed by Alison Brie, John Reynolds, Nick Offerman, and Megan Mullally, respectively.

See also
 List of American films of 1939

References

 American Broadcasting Companies
 MGM Home Entertainment

External links

 
 
 
 
 
 
 Made for Each Other on Lux Radio Theater: February 19, 1940

1939 films
1930s romantic comedy-drama films
American black-and-white films
American romantic comedy-drama films
1930s English-language films
Films about marriage
Films directed by John Cromwell
Films produced by David O. Selznick
Films set in 1938
Films set in 1939
Films set in New York City
Films with screenplays by Jo Swerling
Films set around New Year
Selznick International Pictures films
United Artists films
1939 comedy films
1939 drama films
1930s American films